Britta Näpel (born 16 February 1966) is a German rider who competes in para-dressage riding. She has won a gold, four silver, and one bronze medals.

Career 
Näpel is a master horsewoman and lives in Wonsheim, where she runs a center for therapeutic riding. Her home trainer is the German dressage rider Uta Gräf.

Britta Näpel started riding at the age of 14. She was particularly active as an eventing rider. In 1998, she poisoned herself with an insect repellent; a serious consequence of this was a spastic paralysis, especially in the legs and trunk area. In 2002 she started riding again as part of hippotherapy. A year later she took part in handicapped dressage.

Britta Näpel is assigned to the competition class Grade III (referred to as Grade II until 2016). As an aid, she rides with two whips and special stirrups that prevent her feet from slipping. 

At the 2004 Paralympic Games in Athens, she won a silver medal in Mixed Dressage Team Open, and competed in Mixed Dressage - Freestyle Grade II, and Mixed Dressage - Championship Grade II.

At the 2008 Paralympic Games in Beijing, she won a gold medal in Mixed Dressage - Championship Grade II, silver medal in Mixed Dressage Team Open, and bronze medal in Mixed Dressage - Freestyle Grade II.

At the 2012 Summer Paralympics, in London, she won silver medals in Dressage - Freestyle Grade II, Dressage - Championship Grade II, and Dressage - Team.

References 

Living people
1966 births
Paralympic equestrians of Germany
German female equestrians
Equestrians at the 2004 Summer Paralympics
Equestrians at the 2008 Summer Paralympics
Equestrians at the 2012 Summer Paralympics
Medalists at the 2004 Summer Paralympics
Medalists at the 2008 Summer Paralympics
Medalists at the 2012 Summer Paralympics
Paralympic gold medalists for Germany
Paralympic silver medalists for Germany
Paralympic bronze medalists for Germany